Roburin A is a tannin found in oak wood (Quercus robur and Quercus petraea or Quercus alba) or oak cork (Quercus suber).

It is a dimeric compound, composed of two vescalagin subunits probably linked through an ether bond between the diphenoyl group (hexahydroxydiphenic acid or HHDP) of one subunit and the triphenoyl moiety (nonahydroxytriphenic acid) of the other one.

References 

Ellagitannins
Tannin dimers